Andreas Schicker (born 6 July 1986) is an Austrian footballer who plays for SC Bruck/Mur and is also working as a sporting director at Wiener Neustadt.

In November 2014, he injured both hands in an accident with fireworks and his left hand had to be amputated.

References

External links
 

Austrian footballers
Austrian Football Bundesliga players
1986 births
Living people
FK Austria Wien players
SV Ried players
FC Admira Wacker Mödling players
SC Wiener Neustadt players

Association football defenders